An election for the leadership of the Social Democratic and Labour Party (SDLP) was held 5–7 February 2010. Margaret Ritchie defeated her only challenger, Alasdair McDonnell, by 222 votes to 187.

Background
The former SDLP leader, Mark Durkan, announced his intention to stand down as leader of the SDLP in September 2009, citing that he did not want to continue to lead the party past his 50th birthday, and also to allow him to concentrate on his parliamentary career. Subsequently, a leadership election was scheduled for the SDLP annual conference in February 2010.

Candidates
Two SDLP members contested the leadership election. These were:
Alasdair McDonnell - MP for South Belfast as well as MLA for the corresponding constituency in the Northern Ireland Assembly. McDonnell was also the Deputy Leader of the SDLP prior to the leadership election.
Margaret Ritchie - MLA for South Down and Minister for Social Development in the Northern Ireland Assembly.

Results
Below is a table summarising the result of the leadership election:

Margaret Ritchie was duly named the new SDLP leader on 7 February 2010.

References

Social Democratic and Labour Party leadership elections
Social Democratic and Labour Party leadership election